Manar is a locality in the Queanbeyan-Palerang Region, Southern Tablelands, New South Wales, Australia. It lies on both sides of the Kings Highway between Bungendore and Braidwood at the intersection with the Braidwood–Goulburn road. 

Manar was named after Manar House, which was built by Hugh Gordon after buying the property in 1841, shortly after his marriage to Mary Macarthur, daughter of Hannibal Hawkins Macarthur. Manar House is described in the New South Wales State Heritage Register as "a good example of a Georgian homestead with outbuildings". The property had been established in the 1820s by Dr Matthew Anderson with the name of Redesdale. Gordon renamed it after his family house in Inverurie, Scotland. This was named by Gordon's father (of the same name) after the Gulf of Mannar, which separates India and Sri Lanka and was notable for its pearling industry. It was said that the elder Hugh Gordon had made part of his fortune from the pearl trade.

Manar had a public school from 1883 and 1907; from 1896 it operated as a "half-time" school.

References

Queanbeyan–Palerang Regional Council
Localities in New South Wales
Southern Tablelands